The 1979–80 Florida State Seminoles men's basketball team represented the Florida State University during the 1979–80 NCAA men's basketball season.

Roster

Schedule

|-
!colspan=12 style=|Metro tournament

|-
!colspan=12 style=|NCAA Tournament

References 

Florida State Seminoles men's basketball seasons
1979 in sports in Florida
1980 in sports in Florida
Florida State
Florida State Seminoles